Lynn Hughes (1951) is a Canadian artist and academic.

Work
From the early 1980s to mid 1990s Hughes was known for her paintings that integrated scientific and philosophical issues.

Academic career
Hughes is a professor of Intermedia in the studio arts department of Concordia University, where she is also the Research Chair in Interaction Design and Games Innovation. Hughes is also head of the Technoculture, Art and Games cluster in the Milieux research collective at Concordia.

Collections
Several of Hughes' works on paper are included in the permanent collection of the National Gallery of Canada.

References

Artists from Montreal
Canadian sculptors
Canadian academics of fine arts
Canadian women artists
1951 births
Living people
Academic staff of Concordia University